Wolftail Mountain is located in the Lewis Range, Glacier National Park in the U.S. state of Montana.

Climate 
According to the Köppen climate classification system, Wolftail Mountain is located in an alpine subarctic climate zone with long, cold, snowy winters, and cool to warm summers. Winter temperatures can drop below −10 °F with wind chill factors below −30 °F. Due to its altitude, it receives precipitation all year, as snow in winter, and as thunderstorms in summer.

See also
 Mountains and mountain ranges of Glacier National Park (U.S.)

References

Mountains of Flathead County, Montana
Wolftail Mountain
Lewis Range
Mountains of Montana